The neurobiological effects of physical exercise are numerous and involve a wide range of interrelated effects on brain structure, brain function, and cognition. A large body of research in humans has demonstrated that consistent aerobic exercise (e.g., 30 minutes every day) induces persistent improvements in certain cognitive functions, healthy alterations in gene expression in the brain, and beneficial forms of neuroplasticity and behavioral plasticity; some of these long-term effects include: increased neuron growth, increased neurological activity (e.g.,  and BDNF signaling), improved stress coping, enhanced cognitive control of behavior, improved declarative, spatial, and working memory, and structural and functional improvements in brain structures and pathways associated with cognitive control and memory. The effects of exercise on cognition have important implications for improving academic performance in children and college students, improving adult productivity, preserving cognitive function in old age, preventing or treating certain neurological disorders, and improving overall quality of life.

In healthy adults, aerobic exercise has been shown to induce transient effects on cognition after a single exercise session and persistent effects on cognition following regular exercise over the course of several months. People who regularly perform an aerobic exercise (e.g., running, jogging, brisk walking, swimming, and cycling) have greater scores on neuropsychological function and performance tests that measure certain cognitive functions, such as attentional control, inhibitory control, cognitive flexibility, working memory updating and capacity, declarative memory, spatial memory, and information processing speed. The transient effects of exercise on cognition include improvements in most executive functions (e.g., attention, working memory, cognitive flexibility, inhibitory control, problem solving, and decision making) and information processing speed for a period of up to 2 hours after exercising. 

Aerobic exercise induces short- and long-term effects on mood and emotional states by promoting positive affect, inhibiting negative affect, and decreasing the biological response to acute psychological stress. Over the short-term, aerobic exercise functions as both an antidepressant and euphoriant, whereas consistent exercise produces general improvements in mood and self-esteem.

Regular aerobic exercise improves symptoms associated with a variety of central nervous system disorders and may be used as adjunct therapy for these disorders.  There is clear evidence of exercise treatment efficacy for major depressive disorder and attention deficit hyperactivity disorder. The American Academy of Neurology's clinical practice guideline for mild cognitive impairment indicates that clinicians should recommend regular exercise (two times per week) to individuals who have been diagnosed with this condition. Reviews of clinical evidence also support the use of exercise as an adjunct therapy for certain neurodegenerative disorders, particularly Alzheimer's disease and Parkinson's disease. Regular exercise is also associated with a lower risk of developing neurodegenerative disorders. A large body of preclinical evidence and emerging clinical evidence supports the use of exercise as an adjunct therapy for the treatment and prevention of drug addictions. Regular exercise has also been proposed as an adjunct therapy for brain cancers.

Long-term effects

Neuroplasticity
Neuroplasticity is the process by which neurons adapt to a disturbance over time, and most often occurs in response to repeated exposure to stimuli. Aerobic exercise increases the production of neurotrophic factors (e.g., BDNF, IGF-1, VEGF) which mediate improvements in cognitive functions and various forms of memory by promoting blood vessel formation in the brain, adult neurogenesis, and other forms of neuroplasticity. Consistent aerobic exercise over a period of several months induces clinically significant improvements in executive functions and increased gray matter volume in nearly all regions of the brain, with the most marked increases occurring in brain regions that give rise to executive functions. The brain structures that show the greatest improvements in gray matter volume in response to aerobic exercise are the prefrontal cortex, caudate nucleus, and hippocampus; less significant increases in gray matter volume occur in the anterior cingulate cortex, parietal cortex, cerebellum, and nucleus accumbens. The prefrontal cortex, caudate nucleus, and anterior cingulate cortex are among the most significant brain structures in the dopamine and norepinephrine systems that give rise to cognitive control. Exercise-induced neurogenesis (i.e., the increases in gray matter volume) in the hippocampus is associated with measurable improvements in spatial memory. Higher physical fitness scores, as measured by VO2 max, are associated with better executive function, faster information processing speed, and greater gray matter volume of the hippocampus, caudate nucleus, and nucleus accumbens. Long-term aerobic exercise is also associated with persistent beneficial epigenetic changes that result in improved stress coping, improved cognitive function, and increased neuronal activity ( and BDNF signaling).

Structural growth

Reviews of neuroimaging studies indicate that consistent aerobic exercise increases gray matter volume in nearly all regions of the brain, with more pronounced increases occurring in brain regions associated with memory processing, cognitive control, motor function, and reward; the most prominent gains in gray matter volume are seen in the prefrontal cortex, caudate nucleus, and hippocampus, which support cognitive control and memory processing, among other cognitive functions. Moreover, the left and right halves of the prefrontal cortex, the hippocampus, and the cingulate cortex appear to become more functionally interconnected in response to consistent aerobic exercise. Three reviews indicate that marked improvements in prefrontal and hippocampal gray matter volume occur in healthy adults that regularly engage in medium intensity exercise for several months. Other regions of the brain that demonstrate moderate or less significant gains in gray matter volume during neuroimaging include the anterior cingulate cortex, parietal cortex, cerebellum, and nucleus accumbens.

Regular exercise has been shown to counter the shrinking of the hippocampus and memory impairment that naturally occurs in late adulthood. Sedentary adults over age 55 show a 1–2% decline in hippocampal volume annually. A neuroimaging study with a sample of 120 adults revealed that participating in regular aerobic exercise increased the volume of the left hippocampus by 2.12% and the right hippocampus by 1.97% over a one-year period. Subjects in the low intensity stretching group who had higher fitness levels at baseline showed less hippocampal volume loss, providing evidence for exercise being protective against age-related cognitive decline. In general, individuals that exercise more over a given period have greater hippocampal volumes and better memory function. Aerobic exercise has also been shown to induce growth in the white matter tracts in the anterior corpus callosum, which normally shrink with age.

The various functions of the brain structures that show exercise-induced increases in gray matter volume include:
 Caudate nucleus – responsible for stimulus-response learning and inhibitory control; implicated in Parkinson's disease and ADHD
 Cerebellum – responsible for motor coordination and motor learning
 Hippocampus – responsible for storage and consolidation of declarative memory and spatial memory; implicated in depression
 Nucleus accumbens – responsible for incentive salience ("wanting" or desire, the form of motivation associated with reward) and positive reinforcement; implicated in addiction
 Parietal cortex – responsible for sensory perception, working memory, and attention
 Prefrontal and anterior cingulate cortices – required for the cognitive control of behavior, particularly: working memory, attentional control, decision-making, cognitive flexibility, social cognition, and inhibitory control of behavior; implicated in attention deficit hyperactivity disorder (ADHD) and addiction

Persistent effects on cognition 

Concordant with the functional roles of the brain structures that exhibit increased gray matter volumes, regular exercise over a period of several months has been shown to persistently improve numerous executive functions and several forms of memory. In particular, consistent aerobic exercise has been shown to improve attentional control, information processing speed, cognitive flexibility (e.g., task switching), inhibitory control, working memory updating and capacity, declarative memory, and spatial memory. In healthy young and middle-aged adults, the effect sizes of improvements in cognitive function are largest for indices of executive functions and small to moderate for aspects of memory and information processing speed. It may be that in older adults, individuals benefit cognitively by taking part in both aerobic and resistance type exercise of at least moderate intensity. Individuals who have a sedentary lifestyle tend to have impaired executive functions relative to other more physically active non-exercisers. A reciprocal relationship between exercise and executive functions has also been noted: improvements in executive control processes, such as attentional control and inhibitory control, increase an individual's tendency to exercise.

Mechanism of effects

BDNF signaling

One of the most significant effects of exercise on the brain is increased synthesis and expression of BDNF, a neuropeptide and hormone, resulting in increased signaling through its receptor tyrosine kinase, tropomyosin receptor kinase B (TrkB). Since BDNF is capable of crossing the blood–brain barrier, higher peripheral BDNF synthesis also increases BDNF signaling in the brain. Exercise-induced increases in BDNF signaling are associated with beneficial epigenetic changes, improved cognitive function, improved mood, and improved memory. Furthermore, research has provided a great deal of support for the role of BDNF in hippocampal neurogenesis, synaptic plasticity, and neural repair. Engaging in moderate-high intensity aerobic exercise such as running, swimming, and cycling increases BDNF biosynthesis through myokine signaling, resulting in up to a threefold increase in blood plasma and BDNF levels; exercise intensity is positively correlated with the magnitude of increased BDNF biosynthesis and expression. A meta-analysis of studies involving the effect of exercise on BDNF levels found that consistent exercise modestly increases resting BDNF levels as well. This has important implications for exercise as a mechanism to reduce stress since stress is closely linked with decreased levels of BDNF in the hippocampus. In fact, studies suggest that BDNF contributes to the anxiety-reducing effects of antidepressants. The increase in BDNF levels caused by exercise helps reverse the stress-induced decrease in BDNF which mediates stress in the short term and buffers against stress-related diseases in the long term.

IGF-1 signaling

 is a peptide and neurotrophic factor that mediates some of the effects of growth hormone; IGF-1 elicits its physiological effects by binding to a specific receptor tyrosine kinase, the IGF-1 receptor, to control tissue growth and remodeling. In the brain, IGF-1 functions as a neurotrophic factor that, like , plays a significant role in cognition, neurogenesis, and neuronal survival. Physical activity is associated with increased levels of IGF-1 in blood serum, which is known to contribute to neuroplasticity in the brain due to its capacity to cross the blood–brain barrier and blood–cerebrospinal fluid barrier; consequently, one review noted that IGF-1 is a key mediator of exercise-induced adult neurogenesis, while a second review characterized it as a factor which links "body fitness" with "brain fitness". The amount of IGF-1 released into blood plasma during exercise is positively correlated with exercise intensity and duration.

VEGF signaling

 is a neurotrophic and angiogenic (i.e., blood vessel growth-promoting) signaling protein that binds to two receptor tyrosine kinases, VEGFR1 and VEGFR2, which are expressed in neurons and glial cells in the brain. Hypoxia, or inadequate cellular oxygen supply, strongly upregulates VEGF expression and VEGF exerts a neuroprotective effect in hypoxic neurons. Exercise-induced increases in VEGF signaling have been shown to improve cerebral blood volume and contribute to exercise-induced neurogenesis in the hippocampus.

GPLD1
In July 2020 scientists reported that after mice exercise their livers secrete the protein GPLD1, which is also elevated in elderly humans who exercise regularly, that this is associated with improved cognitive function in aged mice and that increasing the amount of GPLD1 produced by the mouse liver in old mice via genetic engineering could yield many benefits of regular exercise for their brains – such as increased BDNF-levels, neurogenesis, and improved cognitive functioning in tests.

Irisin

A study using FNDC5 knock-out mice as well as artificial elevation of circulating irisin levels showed that irisin confers beneficial cognitive effects of physical exercise and that it can serve an exercise mimetic in mice in which it could "improve both the cognitive deficit and neuropathology in Alzheimer's disease mouse models". The mediator and its regulatory system is therefore being investigated for potential interventions to improve – or further improve – cognitive function or alleviate Alzheimer's disease in humans. Experiments indicate irisin may be linked to regulation of BDNF and neurogenesis in mice.

Short-term effects

Transient effects on cognition

In addition to the persistent effects on cognition that result from several months of daily exercise, acute exercise (i.e., a single bout of exercise) has been shown to transiently improve a number of cognitive functions. Reviews and meta-analyses of research on the effects of acute exercise on cognition in healthy young and middle-aged adults have concluded that information processing speed and a number of executive functions – including attention, working memory, problem solving, cognitive flexibility, verbal fluency, decision making, and inhibitory control – all improve for a period of up to 2 hours post-exercise. A systematic review of studies conducted on children also suggested that some of the exercise-induced improvements in executive function are apparent after single bouts of exercise, while other aspects (e.g., attentional control) only improve following consistent exercise on a regular basis. Other research has suggested immediate performative enhancements during exercise, such as exercise-concurrent improvements in processing speed during visual working memory tasks.

Exercise-induced euphoria

Continuous exercise can produce a transient state of euphoria – a positively-valenced affective state involving the experience of pleasure and feelings of profound contentment, elation, and well-being – which is colloquially known as a "runner's high" in distance running or a "rower's high" in rowing. Current medical reviews indicate that several endogenous euphoriants are responsible for producing exercise-related euphoria, specifically phenethylamine (an endogenous psychostimulant),  (an endogenous opioid), and anandamide (an endogenous cannabinoid).

Effects on neurochemistry

β-Phenylethylamine

β-Phenylethylamine, commonly referred to as phenethylamine, is a human trace amine and potent catecholaminergic and glutamatergic neuromodulator that has similar psychostimulant and euphoriant effects and a similar chemical structure to amphetamine. Thirty minutes of moderate to high intensity physical exercise has been shown to induce an enormous increase in urinary , the primary metabolite of phenethylamine. Two reviews noted a study where the average 24 hour urinary  concentration among participants following just 30 minutes of intense exercise increased by 77% relative to baseline concentrations in resting control subjects; the reviews suggest that phenethylamine synthesis sharply increases while an individual is exercising, during which time it is rapidly metabolized due to its short half-life of roughly 30 seconds.

In light of this observation, the original paper and both reviews suggest that phenethylamine plays a prominent role in mediating the mood-enhancing euphoric effects of a runner's high, as both phenethylamine and amphetamine are potent euphoriants.

β-Endorphin

β-Endorphin (contracted from "endogenous morphine") is an endogenous opioid neuropeptide that binds to μ-opioid receptors, in turn producing euphoria and pain relief. Moderate intensity exercise produces the greatest increase in  synthesis, while higher and lower intensity forms of exercise are associated with smaller increases in  synthesis.
However, data from rodents and humans have shown that pharmacological blockade of endogenous endorphins does not prevent the development of a runner's high, while blockade of endocannabinoids does.

Anandamide

Anandamide is an endogenous cannabinoid and retrograde neurotransmitter that binds to cannabinoid receptors (primarily CB1), in turn producing euphoria. It has been shown that aerobic exercise causes an increase in plasma anandamide levels, where the magnitude of this increase is highest at moderate exercise intensity (i.e., exercising at ~⁠70⁠–⁠80⁠% maximum heart rate). Increases in plasma anandamide levels are associated with psychoactive effects because anandamide is able to cross the blood–brain barrier and act within the central nervous system. Thus, because anandamide is a euphoriant and aerobic exercise is associated with euphoric effects, it has been proposed that anandamide partly mediates the short-term mood-lifting effects of exercise (e.g., the euphoria of a runner's high) via exercise-induced increases in its synthesis. 

In mice it was demonstrated that certain features of a runner's high depend on cannabinoid receptors. Pharmacological or genetic disruption of cannabinoid signaling via cannabinoid receptors prevents the analgesic and anxiety-reducing effects of running.

Cortisol and the psychological stress response

 
The "stress hormone", cortisol, is a glucocorticoid that binds to glucocorticoid receptors. Psychological stress induces the release of cortisol from the adrenal gland by activating the hypothalamic–pituitary–adrenal axis (HPA axis). Short-term increases in cortisol levels are associated with adaptive cognitive improvements, such as enhanced inhibitory control; however, excessively high exposure or prolonged exposure to high levels of cortisol causes impairments in cognitive control and has neurotoxic effects in the human brain. For example, chronic psychological stress decreases  expression, which has detrimental effects on hippocampal volume and can lead to depression.

As a physical stressor, aerobic exercise stimulates cortisol secretion in an intensity-dependent manner; however, it does not result in long-term increases in cortisol production since this exercise-induced effect on cortisol is a response to transient negative energy balance. Individuals who have recently exercised exhibit improvements in stress coping behaviors. Aerobic exercise increases physical fitness and lowers neuroendocrine (i.e.) reactivity and therefore reduces the biological response to psychological stress in humans (e.g., reduced cortisol release and attenuated heart rate response). Exercise also reverses stress-induced decreases in  expression and signaling in the brain, thereby acting as a buffer against stress-related diseases like depression.

Glutamate and GABA

Glutamate, one of the most common neurochemicals in the brain, is an excitatory neurotransmitter involved in many aspects of brain function, including learning and memory. Based upon animal models, exercise appears to normalize the excessive levels of glutamate neurotransmission into the nucleus accumbens that occurs in drug addiction. A review of the effects of exercise on neurocardiac function in preclinical models noted that exercise-induced neuroplasticity of the rostral ventrolateral medulla (RVLM) has an inhibitory effect on glutamatergic neurotransmission in this region, in turn reducing sympathetic activity; the review hypothesized that this neuroplasticity in the RVLM is a mechanism by which regular exercise prevents inactivity-related cardiovascular disease.

Monoamine neurotransmitters

Acetylcholine

Exerkines and other circulating compounds
Exerkines are "signalling moieties released in response to acute and/or chronic exercise, which exert their effects through endocrine, paracrine and/or autocrine pathways" and are "increasingly recognized as critical mediators of exercise-related changes and health benefits". They have "a multitude of purported effects on the nervous system".

A study found that Lac-Phe was the most significantly induced circulating metabolite in two animal models of exercise, with increases also being observed in humans, which – including via chronic administration – reduces food intake or appetite in the obese and suppresses obesity.

Effects in children

Sibley and Etnier (2003) performed a meta-analysis that looked at the relationship between physical activity and cognitive performance in children. They reported a beneficial relationship in the categories of perceptual skills, intelligence quotient, achievement, verbal tests, mathematic tests, developmental level/academic readiness and other, with the exception of memory, that was found to be unrelated to physical activity. The correlation was strongest for the age ranges of 4–7 and 11–13 years. On the other hand, Chaddock and colleagues (2011) found results that contrasted Sibley and Etnier's meta-analysis. In their study, the hypothesis was that lower-fit children would perform poorly in executive control of memory and have smaller hippocampal volumes compared to higher-fit children. Instead of physical activity being unrelated to memory in children between 4 and 18 years of age, it may be that preadolescents of higher fitness have larger hippocampal volumes, than preadolescents of lower fitness. According to a previous study done by Chaddock and colleagues (Chaddock et al. 2010), a larger hippocampal volume would result in better executive control of memory. They concluded that hippocampal volume was positively associated with performance on relational memory tasks. Their findings are the first to indicate that aerobic fitness may relate to the structure and function of the preadolescent human brain. In Best's (2010) meta-analysis of the effect of activity on children's executive function, there are two distinct experimental designs used to assess aerobic exercise on cognition. The first is chronic exercise, in which children are randomly assigned to a schedule of aerobic exercise over several weeks and later assessed at the end. The second is acute exercise, which examines the immediate changes in cognitive functioning after each session. The results of both suggest that aerobic exercise may briefly aid children's executive function and also influence more lasting improvements to executive function. Other studies have suggested that exercise is unrelated to academic performance, perhaps due to the parameters used to determine exactly what academic achievement is. This area of study has been a focus for education boards that make decisions on whether physical education should be implemented in the school curriculum, how much time should be dedicated to physical education, and its impact on other academic subjects.

Another study found that sixth-graders who participated in vigorous physical activity at least three times a week had the highest scores compared to those who participated in moderate or no physical activity at all. The kids who participated in vigorous physical activity scored three points higher, on average, on their academic test, which consisted of math, science, English, and world studies.

Animal studies have also shown that exercise can impact brain development early on in life. Mice that had access to running wheels and other such exercise equipment had better neuronal growth in the neural systems involved in learning and memory. Neuroimaging of the human brain has yielded similar results, where exercise leads to changes in brain structure and function. Some investigations have linked low levels of aerobic fitness in children with impaired executive function in older adults, but there is mounting evidence it may also be associated with a lack of selective attention, response inhibition, and interference control.

Effects on central nervous system disorders

Exercise as prevention and treatment of drug addictions

Clinical and preclinical evidence indicate that consistent aerobic exercise, especially endurance exercise (e.g., marathon running), actually prevents the development of certain drug addictions and is an effective adjunct treatment for drug addiction, and psychostimulant addiction in particular. Consistent aerobic exercise magnitude-dependently (i.e., by duration and intensity) reduces drug addiction risk, which appears to occur through the reversal of drug-induced, addiction-related neuroplasticity. One review noted that exercise may prevent the development of drug addiction by altering ΔFosB or c-Fos immunoreactivity in the striatum or other parts of the reward system. Moreover, aerobic exercise decreases psychostimulant self-administration, reduces the reinstatement (i.e., relapse) of drug-seeking, and induces opposite effects on striatal dopamine receptor D2 (DRD2) signaling (increased DRD2 density) to those induced by pathological stimulant use (decreased DRD2 density). Consequently, consistent aerobic exercise may lead to better treatment outcomes when used as an adjunct treatment for drug addiction. , more clinical research is still needed to understand the mechanisms and confirm the efficacy of exercise in drug addiction treatment and prevention.

Attention deficit hyperactivity disorder

Regular physical exercise, particularly aerobic exercise, is an effective add-on treatment for ADHD in children and adults, particularly when combined with stimulant medication (i.e., amphetamine or methylphenidate), although the best intensity and type of aerobic exercise for improving symptoms are not currently known. In particular, the long-term effects of regular aerobic exercise in ADHD individuals include better behavior and motor abilities, improved executive functions (including attention, inhibitory control, and planning, among other cognitive domains), faster information processing speed, and better memory. Parent-teacher ratings of behavioral and socio-emotional outcomes in response to regular aerobic exercise include: better overall function, reduced ADHD symptoms, better self-esteem, reduced levels of anxiety and depression, fewer somatic complaints, better academic and classroom behavior, and improved social behavior. Exercising while on stimulant medication augments the effect of stimulant medication on executive function. It is believed that these short-term effects of exercise are mediated by an increased abundance of synaptic dopamine and norepinephrine in the brain.

Major depressive disorder
A number of medical reviews have indicated that exercise has a marked and persistent antidepressant effect in humans, an effect believed to be mediated through enhanced  signaling in the brain. Several systematic reviews have analyzed the potential for physical exercise in the treatment of depressive disorders. Three subsequent 2014 systematic reviews that included the Cochrane review in their analysis concluded with similar findings: one indicated that physical exercise is effective as an adjunct treatment (i.e., treatments that are used together) with antidepressant medication; the other two indicated that physical exercise has marked antidepressant effects and recommended the inclusion of physical activity as an adjunct treatment for mild–moderate depression and mental illness in general. One systematic review noted that yoga may be effective in alleviating symptoms of prenatal depression. Another review asserted that evidence from clinical trials supports the efficacy of physical exercise as a treatment for depression over a 2–4 month period. These benefits have also been noted in old age, with a review conducted in 2019 finding that exercise is an effective treatment for clinically diagnosed depression in older adults.

A meta-analysis from July 2016 concluded that physical exercise improves overall quality of life in individuals with depression relative to controls.

Mild cognitive impairment

The American Academy of Neurology's January 2018 update of their clinical practice guideline for mild cognitive impairment states that clinicians should recommend regular exercise (two times per week) to individuals who have been diagnosed with this condition. This guidance is based upon a moderate amount of high-quality evidence which supports the efficacy of regular physical exercise (twice weekly over a 6-month period) for improving cognitive symptoms in individuals with mild cognitive impairment.

Neurodegenerative disorders

Alzheimer's disease

Alzheimer's disease is a cortical neurodegenerative disorder and the most prevalent form of dementia, representing approximately 65% of all cases of dementia; it is characterized by impaired cognitive function, behavioral abnormalities, and a reduced capacity to perform basic activities of daily life. Two meta-analytic systematic reviews of randomized controlled trials with durations of 3–12 months have examined the effects of physical exercise on the aforementioned characteristics of Alzheimer's disease. The reviews found beneficial effects of physical exercise on cognitive function, the rate of cognitive decline, and the ability to perform activities of daily living in individuals with Alzheimer's disease. One review suggested that, based upon transgenic mouse models, the cognitive effects of exercise on Alzheimer's disease may result from a reduction in the quantity of amyloid plaque.

The Caerphilly Prospective study followed 2,375 male subjects over 30 years and examined the association between healthy lifestyles and dementia, among other factors. Analyses of the Caerphilly study data have found that exercise is associated with a lower incidence of dementia and a reduction in cognitive impairment. A subsequent systematic review of longitudinal studies also found higher levels of physical activity to be associated with a reduction in the risk of dementia and cognitive decline; this review further asserted that increased physical activity appears to be causally related with these reduced risks.

Parkinson's disease 
Research also suggests that physical exercise is beneficial for those with Parkinson's disease, a neurodegenerative condition characterised by a loss of dopaminergic neurons in an area of the brain known as the substantia nigra. A growing body of evidence suggests that physical exercise may be protective against Parkinson's, reducing the risk by around 29%. These findings are supported by animal studies, which indicate that physical exercise may protect against the loss of dopaminergic neurons by increasing the number of neurotrophic factors in the brain, proteins known to protect against degeneration.

See also

Brain fitness
Exercise is Medicine
Exercise prescription
Exercise therapy
Memory improvement
Neuroinflammation#Exercise
Nootropic

Notes

References

Addiction
Addiction medicine
Aerobic exercise
Antidepressants
Attention
Cognition
Cognitive neuroscience
Epigenetics
Euphoriants
Exercise physiology
Memory
Neuropsychology
Physical exercise
Physical psychiatric treatments
Treatment of depression
Sports science